The 2000 Sioux City Attack season was the team's first overall and first as a member of the original Indoor Football League (IFL). One of twenty-one teams in the IFL for the league's second season, the Attack finished the regular season with a 9–5 record (good enough for third in their Southern Division) to earn the number five seed in the ten-team Western Conference, in which they traveled to Lincoln, Nebraska for the wild card round to play the Lincoln Lightning and defeated them, 52–38. They then moved on to Bismarck, North Dakota, to face the Western's Conference's top-seeded team, the Bismarck Blaze. The Attack had already beaten the Blaze once in the regular season, but fell, 30-14 in the conference semifinals.

The Attack played their home games at the Sioux City Municipal Auditorium in Sioux City, Iowa, under the direction of head coach Jim Anderson.

Schedule
Key:

Regular season

Post-season

2000 Playoffs

Roster

References

Indoor American football seasons
2000 in American football
2000 in sports in Iowa
Sioux City Bandits